The East Swan River is a  tributary of the Saint Louis River in St. Louis County, Minnesota, Minnesota, United States. As of 2021, there is an angling easement on the river, however trout fishing is considered marginal. Some efforts have been made in stocking the river with brown trout, however those efforts have been met with limited success.

See also
List of rivers of Minnesota

References

Minnesota Watersheds
USGS Hydrologic Unit Map - State of Minnesota (1974)

Rivers of Minnesota
Rivers of St. Louis County, Minnesota
Northern Minnesota trout streams